Established in 2000, Al Shamsi Holdings is a fast growing retail organization focusing on fashion in the Gulf Cooperation Council. The company represents international brands Desigual, Scotch & Soda, Vincci, Parfois, Okaidi and Tati. It is one of the leading retail companies in the GCC, employing over 500 multicultural staff, running over 75 stores.

History
Over the past 15 years, they have opened 76 stores across the UAE, Kuwait, Oman, Bahrain and Qatar, with brands from 5 different countries. The first brand to partner with Al Shamsi Holdings were the popular French children’s clothing brand Okaidi. Their most recent partnership is with Scotch & Soda, offering garments from the Netherlands for men, women and children.

Timeline – Opening of a brand’s first store

2002: Okaidi open in Sharjah, Al Shamsi Holdings first store
Okaidi open in Dubai

2004: Parfois open in Abu Dhabi
Parfois open in Kuwait
Okaidi open in Kuwait

2005: Vincci, open in Dubai
Vincci open in Sharjah

2007: Parfois open in Oman
Okaidi open in Oman
Vincci open in Oman

2008: Parfois open in Bahrain 
Parfois open their first store in Dubai
Okaidi open in Bahrain

2009: Desigual open in Dubai
Vincci open in Abu Dhabi

2010: Desigual open in Kuwait
Desigual open in Abu Dhabi
Desigual open in Qatar
Okaidi open in Qatar
Vincci open in Qatar

2011: Scotch & Soda open in Dubai
Vincci open in Bahrain
Vincci open in Ras Al-Khaimah

2012: Okaidi open in Fujairah 
Vincci open in Fujairah
Vincci open in Kuwait
Vincci open in Ajman

2013: Al Shamsi Holdings celebrates its 50th store
Okaidi open in Ras Al-Khaimah
Vincci open in Sharjah
Parfois open in Ras Al-Khaimah
Parfois open in Sharjah

2014: Tati open store in Bahrain
Tati open in Dubai
Desigual Kids open in Abu Dhabi
Scotch & Soda Kids open in Abu Dhabi

References

External links
 Al Shamsi Holdings
 Desigual
 Scotch & Soda
 Vincci
 Parfois
 Okaidi
 Tati

Retail companies of the United Arab Emirates
2000 establishments in the United Arab Emirates